The Pennsylvania Railroad's class R1 comprised a single prototype electric locomotive constructed in 1934 by the Baldwin Locomotive Works of Philadelphia, Pennsylvania, USA, with the electrical equipment by Westinghouse.

It was built as a competitor to the GG1 design, but after trials the GG1 was selected for volume production on the basis of its superior tracking and riding qualities; the R1 prototype, however, remained in service.  It was numbered 4800 originally, swapped numbers with the victorious GG1 prototype to #4899, but was moved in May 1940 to #4999 to make room for the expanding GG1 fleet.

For many years, the R1's regular duties involved hauling the westbound Broadway Limited and returning eastward with a mail and express train.  The long rigid wheelbase of the locomotive caused occasional derailments in Sunnyside Yard and elsewhere.  The R1 was withdrawn from service and sent for scrap in 1958.

The R1 design had four driven axles in a rigid locomotive frame, like a steam locomotive.  Each was driven by two  traction motors driving the wheels through a quill drive and sprung cups.  Each end of the double-ended locomotive has a four-wheel truck to guide the locomotive at speed, giving the R1 a 4-8-4 wheel arrangement in the Whyte notation (AAR: 2-D-2; UIC: 2'Do'2). Besides the R1, the PRR did not build or order any other 4-8-4  locomotives, however the T1 duplex was essentially a 4-8-4 with 2 sets of driving wheels, making it a 4-4-4-4. In many respects the design resembled the earlier, lighter P5, but with an extra driving axle and lower axle loads.

References

Baldwin locomotives
4-8-4 locomotives
R1
11 kV AC locomotives
Experimental locomotives
Westinghouse locomotives
Individual locomotives of the United States
Passenger locomotives
Electric locomotives of the United States
Unique locomotives
Standard gauge locomotives of the United States
Scrapped locomotives
Streamlined electric locomotives